The Pitimbu River is a river of Rio Grande do Norte state in northeastern Brazil.
In 2007 the river was tested for potential cytotoxic and genotoxic surface water.

See also
List of rivers of Rio Grande do Norte

References
Brazilian Society of Genetics.
Brazilian Ministry of Transport

Rivers of Rio Grande do Norte